Deathstar Rising is the sixth album by Finnish metal band Before the Dawn, released on 25 February 2011, by Nuclear Blast in Europe (3 May 2011 is the release date for the USA). 
The album reached the Finnish top ten, peaking at number eight.

Background
In June 2011 it was announced that with mutual decision, Lars Eikind and Atte Palokangas left the band after the gig at Nummirock festival on 25 June. Lars left due to personal reasons and Atte purely musical.

Track listing

Charts

References

External links
 Before the Dawn official website Media page

2011 albums
Before the Dawn (band) albums